Gorabous is a town located in the centre of Dikhil Region in Djibouti.

Overview
Nearby towns and villages include Yoboki (30 km), Dikhil (29 km) and Galafi (70 km).

References
Gorabous, Djibouti

Populated places in Djibouti